Olivia Rose Keegan is an American actress. She came to prominence playing Claire Brady on NBC network daytime soap opera Days of Our Lives. She was nominated for the Daytime Emmy Award for Outstanding Younger Actress in a Drama Series for the role in 2018 and 2019, and was the first winner for the Outstanding Younger Performer in a Drama Series category in 2020. She played the recurring role of Lily in the second season of the Disney+ television series High School Musical: The Musical: The Series. Since March 2023, Keegan has starred as Duela, the daughter of the Joker, on The CW superhero television series Gotham Knights.

Early life
Keegan was born in San Rafael, California to Kevin and Julie Keegan. She began performing in community theater at age seven.

Career
At age eleven, Keegan decided she wanted to switch her focus from stage acting to on-camera acting, and soon booked roles in the short film Picture Perfect and the 2013 film Decoding Annie Parker. From 2012 to 2014, she worked on the television film Hand of God, and the film Amnesiac. She guest-starred on several TV shows, including Modern Family, Sam & Cat, Enlisted, and Growing Up Fisher. In 2015, she guest-starred in an episode of The Thundermans, and starred in a family film called Salvation Street. Keegan is signed with Paradigm Talent and Artistic Endeavors.

In 2015 she booked the role of Claire Brady on the soap opera Days of Our Lives, a role which she played through 2020. In 2018, she released a song, "Queen is a King". In early 2020, she joined the cast in the second season of the Disney+ television series High School Musical: The Musical: The Series playing the recurring role of Lily. In March 2022, Keegan was cast in a starring role, playing Duela the daughter of the Joker, on the television series Gotham Knights, which premiered on The CW on March 14, 2023.

Filmography

Awards and nominations

References

External links
 
 

American film actresses
American television actresses
American soap opera actresses
Living people
Actresses from San Francisco
Daytime Emmy Award winners
Daytime Emmy Award for Outstanding Younger Performer in a Drama Series winners
21st-century American women
Year of birth missing (living people)